Samantha Barry is the current editor-in-chief for Glamour magazine.

Career
Barry was born in Ballincollig, Cork, Ireland, to Máiréad and David Barry, and graduated with an Arts degree in English and Psychology from University College Cork and an MA in Journalism from Dublin City University.

Starting with The University Examiner, Barry has worked as a reporter and journalist for RTÉ, the Australian Broadcasting Corporation, Newstalk, the BBC, and CNN, where she was an executive producer for CNN Worldwide.

Barry led news coverage from the 2016 presidential election and interviewed all the candidates. Led by Barry, CNN's 2016 election coverage received the first ever Edward R. Murrow Award for excellence in social media and a Webby Award recognizing the same 2016 campaign work.
Barry has also worked as a guest lecturer at Yale University and is a Sulzberger Fellow at Columbia University.

Glamour magazine 
In 2018, she was announced as the editor of the US edition of women's magazine Glamour. She is the eighth editor since the magazine's founding in 1939. Barry is the first person never to have worked in print media before leading a Condé Nast magazine. Under Barry's editorship, the US edition of the magazine ceased publishing a monthly print edition to focus on a digital-first model. The January 2019 issue was the last monthly US print issue of Glamour.

References

1982 births
21st-century Irish women writers
Alumni of Dublin City University
Alumni of University College Cork
Irish emigrants to the United States
Irish journalists
Irish women journalists
Irish magazine editors
Irish women editors
Living people
Newspaper reporters and correspondents
People from Cork (city)
Webby Award winners
Women magazine editors